Fusceulima thalassae is a species of sea snail, a marine gastropod mollusk in the family Eulimidae.

Description

The length of the shell measures approximately 2 mm in size.

Distribution

This species occurs in the following locations:

 European waters (ERMS scope)
 United Kingdom Exclusive Economic Zone

References

External links
 To World Register of Marine Species
 Bouchet, P. & Warén, A. (1986). Revision of the Northeast Atlantic bathyal and abyssal Aclididae Eulimidae, Epitonidae (Mollusca, Gastropoda). Bollettino Malacologico. suppl. 2: 297-576

Eulimidae
Gastropods described in 1986